Chenaruiyeh (also Romanized as Chenārū’īyeh and Chenārūyeh) is a village in Heruz Rural District, Kuhsaran District, Ravar County, Kerman Province, Iran. At the 2006 census, its population was 93, in 24 families.

References 

Populated places in Ravar County